AIXI  is a theoretical mathematical formalism for artificial general intelligence.
It combines Solomonoff induction with sequential decision theory.
AIXI was first proposed by Marcus Hutter in 2000 and several results regarding AIXI are proved in Hutter's 2005 book Universal Artificial Intelligence.

AIXI is a reinforcement learning (RL) agent. It maximizes the expected total rewards received from the environment. Intuitively, it simultaneously considers every computable hypothesis (or environment). In each time step, it looks at every possible program and evaluates how many rewards that program generates depending on the next action taken. The promised rewards are then weighted by the subjective belief that this program constitutes the true environment. This belief is computed from the length of the program: longer programs are considered less likely, in line with Occam's razor. AIXI then selects the action that has the highest expected total reward in the weighted sum of all these programs.

Definition 

AIXI is a reinforcement learning agent that interacts with some stochastic and unknown but computable environment . At time step t, the agent chooses an action  (e.g. a limb movement) and executes it in the environment, and the environment responds with a "percept" , which consists of an "observation"  (e.g., a camera image) and a reward , distributed according to the conditional probability , where  is the "history" of actions, observations and rewards. The environment  is thus mathematically represented as a probability distribution over "percepts" (observations and rewards) which depend on the full history, so there is no Markov assumption (as opposed to other RL algorithms). Note again that this probability distribution is unknown to the AIXI agent. Furthermore, note again that  is computable, that is, the observations and rewards received by the agent from the environment  can be computed by some program (which runs on a Turing machine), given the past actions of the AIXI agent.

The only goal of the AIXI agent is to maximise , that is, the sum of rewards from time step 1 to m.

In general, at time step  (which ranges from 1 to m), AIXI, having previously executed actions  (which is often abbreviated in the literature as ) and having observed the history of percepts  (which can be abbreviated as ), chooses and executes in the environment the action, defined as follows 

or, using parentheses, to disambiguate the precedences

Let us break this definition down in order to attempt to fully understand it.

 is the "percept" (which consists of the observation  and reward ) received by the AIXI agent at time step  from the environment (which is unknown and stochastic). Similarly,  is the percept received by AIXI at time step  (the last time step where AIXI is active).

 is the sum of rewards from time step  to time step , so AIXI needs to look into the future to choose its action at time step .

 denotes a monotone universal Turing machine, and  ranges over all (deterministic) programs on the universal machine , which receives as input the program  and the sequence of actions  (that is, all actions), and produces the sequence of percepts . The universal Turing machine  is thus used to "simulate" or compute the environment responses or percepts, given the program  (which "models" the environment) and all actions of the AIXI agent: in this sense, the environment is "computable" (as stated above). Note that, in general, the program which "models" the current and actual environment (where AIXI needs to act) is unknown because the current environment is also unknown. 

 is the length of the program  (which is encoded as a string of bits). Note that . Hence, in the definition above,  should be interpreted as a mixture (in this case, a sum) over all computable environments (which are consistent with the agent's past), each weighted by its complexity .

Let us now put all these components together in order to understand this equation or definition.

At time step t, AIXI chooses the action  where the function  attains its maximum.

Parameters 

The parameters to AIXI are the universal Turing machine U and the agent's lifetime m, which need to be chosen. The latter parameter can be removed by the use of discounting.

The meaning of the word AIXI 

According to Hutter, the word "AIXI" can have several interpretations. There are other interpretations.

Optimality 

AIXI's performance is measured by the expected total number of rewards it receives.
AIXI has been proven to be optimal in the following ways.

 Pareto optimality: there is no other agent that performs at least as well as AIXI in all environments while performing strictly better in at least one environment.
 Balanced Pareto optimality: like Pareto optimality, but considering a weighted sum of environments.
 Self-optimizing: a policy p is called self-optimizing for an environment  if the performance of p approaches the theoretical maximum for  when the length of the agent's lifetime (not time) goes to infinity. For environment classes where self-optimizing policies exist, AIXI is self-optimizing.

It was later shown by Hutter and Jan Leike that balanced Pareto optimality is subjective and that any policy can be considered Pareto optimal, which they describe as undermining all previous optimality claims for AIXI.

However, AIXI does have limitations. It is restricted to maximizing rewards based on percepts as opposed to external states. It also assumes it interacts with the environment solely through action and percept channels, preventing it from considering the possibility of being damaged or modified. Colloquially, this means that it doesn't consider itself to be contained by the environment it interacts with. It also assumes the environment is computable.

Computational aspects 

Like Solomonoff induction, AIXI is incomputable. However, there are computable approximations of it. One such approximation is AIXItl, which performs at least as well as the provably best time t and space l limited agent. Another approximation to AIXI with a restricted environment class is MC-AIXI (FAC-CTW) (which stands for Monte Carlo AIXI FAC-Context-Tree Weighting), which has had some success playing simple games such as partially observable Pac-Man.

See also 
 Gödel machine

References 

 "Universal Algorithmic Intelligence: A mathematical top->down approach", Marcus Hutter, ; also in Artificial General Intelligence, eds. B. Goertzel and C. Pennachin, Springer, 2007, pp. 227–290, .

Optimal decisions
Decision theory
Machine learning